The 2004 Atlanta Braves season marked the franchise's 39th season in Atlanta and 134th overall. The Braves won their 10th consecutive division title, finishing 10 games ahead of the second-place Philadelphia Phillies. 

On September 29, 2004, Bobby Cox won his 2,000th game as a manager. He became the ninth manager to achieve the feat, doing so with a 6-3 win over the New York Mets at Turner Field in the final home game of the year  He was named Manager of the Year after the season ended. 

J. D. Drew replaced Gary Sheffield (lost to the Yankees in free agency) in the outfield, free agent John Thomson joined the rotation, and rookies Adam LaRoche and Charles Thomas saw significant playing time on a younger 2004 Braves team. 

The Braves would face the Houston Astros in the Division Series (the fourth time that these two teams met in seven years, all of which were won by Atlanta), but the Braves lost three games to two.

Offseason
 October 25, 2003: DeWayne Wise was signed as a free agent with the Atlanta Braves.
 November 14, 2003: Jorge Velandia was signed as a free agent with the Atlanta Braves.
 December 10, 2003: John Thomson signed as a free agent with the Atlanta Braves. 
 December 13, 2003: J. D. Drew was traded by the St. Louis Cardinals with Eli Marrero to the Atlanta Braves for Jason Marquis, Ray King, and Adam Wainwright.
 December 23, 2003: Antonio Alfonseca signed as a free agent with the Atlanta Braves.
 January 12, 2004: Julio Franco was re-signed from free agency to the Atlanta Braves.
 February 5, 2004: Russell Branyan was signed as a free agent with the Atlanta Braves.
 March 26, 2004: Chris Reitsma was traded by the Cincinnati Reds to the Atlanta Braves for Bubba Nelson (minors) and Jung Bong.

Regular season

Opening Day starters

Season standings

National League East

Record vs. opponents

Notable transactions
 April 25, 2004: Russell Branyan was traded by the Atlanta Braves to the Cleveland Indians for Scott Sturkie (minors).
 June 7, 2004: Clint Sammons was drafted by the Atlanta Braves in the 6th round of the 2004 amateur draft. Player signed July 12, 2004.

Roster

Player stats

Batting

Starters by position 
Note: Pos = Position; G = Games played; AB = At bats; H = Hits; Avg. = Batting average; HR = Home runs; RBI = Runs batted in

Other batters 
Note: G = Games played; AB = At bats; H = Hits; Avg. = Batting average; HR = Home runs; RBI = Runs batted in

Pitching

Starting pitchers 
Note: G = Games pitched; IP = Innings pitched; W = Wins; L = Losses; ERA = Earned run average; SO = Strikeouts

Other pitchers 
Note: G = Games pitched; IP = Innings pitched; W = Wins; L = Losses; ERA = Earned run average; SO = Strikeouts

Relief pitchers 
Note: G = Games pitched; W = Wins; L = Losses; SV = Saves; ERA = Earned run average; SO = Strikeouts

2004 National League Division Series

Atlanta Braves vs. Houston Astros
Houston wins series, 3-2. Atlanta suffered a 1st round elimination for the third consecutive postseason and fourth time out of the last five.

Award winners
2004 Major League Baseball season
 Bobby Cox was voted National League Manager of the Year for the second of three times with the Atlanta Braves.
 Andruw Jones (outfield) was once again chosen to receive a Gold Glove award.
 Johnny Estrada (catcher) was chosen to receive a Silver Slugger award.
 
2004 Major League Baseball All-Star Game
Johnny Estrada represented the Atlanta Braves as a catcher for the National League All-Star team.

Farm system

Notes

External links
 2004 Atlanta Braves team at Baseball-Reference

Atlanta Braves seasons
Atlanta Braves season
National League East champion seasons
Atlanta